Radical Liberal Party may refer to:

Radical Liberal Party (Luxembourg), a political party in Luxembourg
Radical Liberal Party (Paraguay), a political party in Paraguay
Authentic Radical Liberal Party, a political party in Paraguay
Unified Radical Liberal Party, a political party in Paraguay
Ecuadorian Radical Liberal Party, a political party in Ecuador
Radical Liberal Party, a fictional left-wing Confederate party and the main opposition of the Whig Party in the Southern Victory series

See also  
 Liberal Party